Krasnogvardeyskoye is a rural locality (a selo) and the administrative center of Krasnogvardeysky District of the Republic of Adygea, Russia, located on the shores of Krasnodar Reservoir some  northwest of Maykop.  Population:

References

Rural localities in Krasnogvardeysky District